Stevensville, the name of several places, may refer to:

Australia
 Stevensville, Victoria

Canada
 Stevensville, Ontario

United States
 Stevensville, Maryland
 Stevensville, Michigan
 Stevensville, Montana
 Stevensville, Pennsylvania
 Stevensville, Vermont
 Stevensville, Virginia